The Freydal tournament book is an early 16th century illuminated manuscript held by the Kunsthistorisches Museum in Vienna containing 255 miniature paintings depicting scenes from a series of imaginary late medieval jousting tournaments. It was created by the court painters of the Holy Roman Emperor, Maximilian I  with the intention that the miniatures would be used to illustrate one of the Emperor's "memorial" projects, a prose narrative to be called Freydal. The latter work was never completed in the form Maximilian intended, but the tournament book is one of three surviving elements of the project. The other two are a draft text of the narrative and over 200 drawings created as planning sketches for the miniatures in the tournament book.

The miniatures depict Maximilian, in the guise of the story's eponymous hero, Freydal, taking part in 64 tournaments. For each tournament there are two paintings of jousting on horses and one painting of a foot combat, each against actual, mostly named, aristocrats, office-holders and courtiers of Maximilian's time. Eleven types of horseback joust popular at the time are shown in meticulous detail, as well as a wide variety of weapons used in foot combat. A fourth painting for each tournament depicts a "mummery", a courtly masquerade ball held after the day's jousting had been completed. The names of the artists are unknown but, from the quality of many of the paintings some of the finest miniaturists of the time must have been engaged in the work. Originally 256 paintings were created, but one has been lost since at least the 17th century.

Stored in a number of Habsburg palaces since its creation, the tournament book has been held by the Kunsthistorisches Museum since the 1880s. It is notable as the most extensive visual record of late medieval tournaments and court masquerades that exists.

Background

Maximilian I, Holy Roman Emperor from 1508 to his death in 1519, began planning Freydal in 1502. He intended it to be an allegorical romantic account, in text and with illustrations, of the events leading to his marriage to Mary of Burgundy in 1477. It was one of a number of artistic and literary projects intended to immortalize his life and deeds and those of his Habsburg ancestors, and which he referred to as Gedechtnus (or "memorial"). His aim was not only artistic, but to create political propaganda to enhance his public image.

Over the next ten years planning sketches for the entire work were created and Maximilian dictated a partially completed text of the story to his secretary. According to the draft text, the story is an account of a series of 64 tournaments in which Freydal – a young knight and Maximilian's literary alter ego – demonstrates his valour in combat in order to earn honour and fame and to win the hand of a princess. The theme of the story reflects Maximilian's own enthusiasm for jousting. Unusually for a powerful ruler, Maximilian was himself a regular participant in tournaments and continued to take part in jousts until at least 1511, when he was in his 50s. His affinity for jousting contributed to his soubriquet the "last knight".

As part of the project, and to illustrate the narrative, 256 high-quality miniature paintings based on the planning sketches, were created in the form of a tournament book. Tournament books were a feature of late medieval and renaissance courtly culture and provide a graphic record of jousting and its associated rituals. The Freydal illuminated manuscript is considered one of the most important and precious of this genre. It provides an unparalleled pictorial source of jousting from the late medieval period and is the largest surviving tournament book. It is also the only one to depict spectacular falls. In addition to illustrating the jousts themselves, it represents a remarkable catalogue of the weaponry used during tournaments  and is the most extensive record of mummery that exists. The Freydal tournament book has been recognised in UNESCO’s Memory of the World Programme.

The draft text of the story, which was never completed, has survived but it was never combined with the paintings, as Maximilian had intended, into a single document.

History
The miniature paintings were created between 1512 and 1515 by two dozen anonymous court artists under the direction of the imperial master-taylor. Little is known about the painters, although, from the quality of their work, some of them must have been among the leading miniaturists of their time. Only one painting (folio 116) is signed and then only with the initials "NP". From the painting style, some were part of the Danube school, others show traits of painters from Augsburg or the Low Countries. The miniatures themselves were painted on paper in gouache with gold and silver highlights over pen, pencil and leadpoint with each sheet being  x . In total, the sheets cover .

After their creation, it is presumed that the manuscript containing the miniatures was stored at Maximilian's palace in Innsbruck. This was the repository for the Emperor's library. It is known that, in the 1570s, his great-grandson Ferdinand II, Archduke of Austria moved it from there, with the rest of the library, to Ambras Castle. The first record of its existence dates to 1596, when it was listed in an estate inventory prepared following Ferdinand's death. At the end of the 17th century, the manuscript was bound in leather and secured with brass clasps.

The manuscript was on loan to the Imperial Library in Vienna from 1780 to at least 1796. For most of the 19th century, the manuscript was stored, with the rest of the Ambras collection, at the Lower Belvedere Palace in Vienna.  However, in the 1880s the Ambras collection, together with the manuscript, was moved to its current home in Vienna's Kunsthistorisches Museum; the manuscript was given the inventory number KK5073. All but one of the 256 paintings are preserved in the manuscript, with one painting having been lost since at least 1600. In 1992, the manuscript was removed from its binding and the pages separated.

Content
Although the draft text was never combined with the paintings to create a completed work, the tournament book nevertheless mirrors it: 64 tournaments are depicted, with each tournament illustrated by two paintings of horseback jousting, a foot combat painting and a painting of mummery festivities at the end of the day. The miniatures in the tournament book manuscript illustrate the types of jousting popular at the time, both on foot and on horse. Freydal features in each illustrated combat and his opponent is usually an historical figure. There is evidence that Maximilian actually jousted with some of these individuals. Each picture, in the lower margin, identifies the name of the opponent and the other courtiers depicted. The three most prominent opponents in the tournament book are Philipp von Rechberg and Wolfgang von Polheim, both of whom are depicted in jousts eleven times, and Anton von Yfan, Baron of Ivano, who is depicted eight times.

Jousting on horses
Two types of jousting on horses – Rennen and Stechen – are depicted for each tournament. Rennen, or “jousts of war”, are where the lance has a sharpened tip. Stechen, or “jousts of peace”, are where the lance is blunted  with a "coronel" tip (in German, Krönig or Krönlein), meaning that, instead of a sharpened tip, the tip is shaped in the form of a cup made of a three pronged crown.

Within these two broad groupings, eleven sub-types are shown:

Stechen
 Welsches Gestech (Italian joust of peace). A board (or "tilt") separates the jousters so that they can ride more closely to each other and strike their opponent frontally with greater force. This results in a spectacular splintering of the lances. Although the rider's legs were protected from his opponent by the barrier, leg armour was worn to protect the knees from colliding with it as they rode so close to the tilt. 
 Deutsches Gestech (German joust of peace). This differed from the Welsches Gestech in that there was no barrier ("tilt") and leg armour was not worn. The rider's legs had no need for leg armour as his legs were protected by a Stechkissen, a large stuffed u-shaped cushion hanging from the horse's neck.
 Gestech im Hohen Zeug (Joust of peace with high saddles). This was, by Maximilian's time, an out-dated form of joust, which he tried to revive. The riders, who were not separated by a barrier, were enclosed in high saddles which meant that it was virtually impossible for them to be unseated. The objective was to split the lance of the opponent. No leg armour was worn as the rider's legs were protected by the saddle structure.
 Gestech im Beinharnisch (Joust of peace in leg armour). There was no barrier between the riders. But in contrast to the Deutsches Gestech (and the Gestech im Hohen Zeug) leg armour was worn as this provided the only protection for the rider's legs. Like the Gestech im Hohen Zeug, this was by Maximilian's time an out-dated type of joust.

Rennen
 Scharfrennen (Joust of war with "flying" shields). The shield is shown loosely fixed to the rider's breastplate, the aim being to dislodge it.
 Antzogenrennen (Joust of war with fixed shields) The aim is to unseat the opponent and his shield is fixed to his armour.
 Geschiftscheiben-Rennen (Joust of war with "exploding" shields). The aim is to strike a large roundel shield on the chest of the other rider. If the strike is correctly made, a complicated spring mechanism ejects into the air triangular metal segments attached to the surface of the shield.
 Bundrennen (Joust of war with "flying" shields without bevors). One of the most spectacular jousts depicted. The shield is held in place on the rider's breastplate with a complicated spring mechanism and when it is struck in the right place by the opponent the whole shield is ejected high into the air. 
 Geschifttartschen-Rennen (Joust of war with "flying" and "exploding" shields). This combines the Bundrennen with the Geschiftscheiben-Rennen. The spectacle of the Bundrennen is increased by attaching multiple triangular platelets to the shield which, when the shield is ejected, come loose and explode into the air like a firework display. Maximilian claimed to have invented this type of joust.
 Feldrennen (Joust of war in reinforced field armour). This type of joust replicates skirmishes in war and the riders wear lighter battlefield armour, reinforced at the chin, chest and left shoulder. It was a two course joust, where the riders jousted with lances in the first course. Unlike other types of joust, for this course, they did not ride at each other in a pre-agreed straight line but, instead, roamed over an open field and charged at will. In the second course, the lances and reinforced parts of the armour are disguarded and the combat continues with swords.
Krönlrennen (Mixed joust of war and joust of peace). One rider wears the armour of a joust of peace but wields the lance of a joust of war and the other rider has the opposite combination.

Foot jousting
In each of the tournaments, the participants are shown engaging in a foot combat. A variety of weapons are used, including iron clubs (Eisenkolben), flails (Drischel), swords (Turnierschwert) and daggers. With one exception (folio 51), all the foot combat miniatures were painted by the same anonymous artist.

Mummeries
After each of the sixty-four tournaments is a scene depicting a moresca (a pantomime dance) or other post-tournament festivities with male courtiers, including the knights who had competed in the tournament, dressing up to dance in a variety of exotic costumes. Known as ‘mummeries’, these were a regular feature of the evening entertainment after tournaments. Although the illustrations usually depict dances  either row or circle dancing  sometimes other types of mummeries are shown, such as burlesques of little known court ceremonies, prize-givings and mock battles, for example a pike battle between peasants and Landsknechte.

List of miniatures
The following is a list of the 255 miniature paintings contained in the Freydal tournament book. The first column identifies each miniature's folio number, the unique consecutive number added in manuscript to the top left and bottom right corners of each painting in the 17th century. Freydal is present in each image shown. In the jousting paintings, he is one of the two jousters depicted. In the mummery paintings, he is the masked figure holding a torch and often standing slightly apart from the revellers.   The "Image description" column identifies Freydal's opponent in each joust and notable named participants, other than Freydal, at each mummery, in both cases as stated in the manuscript. The last column indicates the page number in Taschen's reproduction of the miniatures published in 2019, and edited by Stefan Krause, which is the source for the information on each miniature in the list (except where another source is referenced by a citation).

Folios 1-64 (Tournaments 1-16)

Folios 65-128 (Tournaments 17-32)

Folios 129-191 (Tournaments 33-48)

Folios 192-255 (Tournaments 49-64)

Notes

References

Bibliography 

 
 
 
 
 
 
 
 
 
 
 
 
 
 
 
 
 
 
 
 
 

16th-century books
16th-century illuminated manuscripts
Medieval tournament
Miniature painting
Paintings in the collection of the Kunsthistorisches Museum
Maximilian I, Holy Roman Emperor